The 1901–02 City Cup was the eighth edition of the City Cup, a cup competition in Irish football.

The tournament was won by Linfield for the sixth time and third consecutive year.

Group standings

References

1901–02 in Irish association football